Hořava (feminine Hořavová) is a Czech surname that may refer to:

 Miloslav Hořava, Czech ice hockey coach and former player
 Pavel Hořava, Czech politician
 Petr Hořava (physicist), Czech physicist and string theorist  
 Petr Hořava (ice hockey), Czech ice hockey player 
 Tomáš Hořava, Czech football player

There are also several physical concepts named after the physicist Petr Hořava:
 Hořava–Lifshitz gravity
 Hořava–Witten domain wall

See also
 

Czech-language surnames